Plamenka is a rural locality (a khutor) in Kletskoye Rural Settlement, Sredneakhtubinsky District, Volgograd Oblast, Russia. The population was 340 as of 2010. There are 8 streets.

Geography 
Plamenka is located 31 km southwest of Srednyaya Akhtuba (the district's administrative centre) by road. Shchuchy is the nearest rural locality.

References 

Rural localities in Sredneakhtubinsky District